Silvia Folloni (born 21 June 1995) is an Italian professional racing cyclist, who rides for UCI Women's Team .

See also
 List of 2015 UCI Women's Teams and riders
 List of 2019 UCI Women's Teams and riders

References

External links

1995 births
Living people
Italian female cyclists
Place of birth missing (living people)
21st-century Italian women